Lady Tata Memorial Trust is a philanthropic body established by Sir Dorabji Tata in April 1932 in memory of his wife, Lady Meherbai, who was diagnosed with leukemia in 1930 at the age of 50, and succumbed to the disease on 18 June 1931. The Trust spends its income for supporting research, both international and Indian, on leukemia. Four-fifth of the income of the Trust is spent on supporting international research. The international awards are restricted to research on leukaemogenic agents, and the epidemiology, pathogenesis, immunology and genetic basis of leukaemia and related disorders. One-fifth of the income is spent for supporting scholars working in Indian universities and institutes. The Indian awards are offered as Post-Doctoral Fellowships for two-year terms and Junior Scholarships for five-year terms. 

The Lady Tata Memorial Trust was one of the earliest philanthropic trusts created to support world-wide leukaemia research. Very little was known
about leukaemia at the time of the establishment of the Trust. The Trust provided fellowships and grants to some of the leading international researchers and contributed significantly to the advancement of knowledge about leukaemia.

References

Charities based in India
Tata institutions